Flowerpot Bay, also spelt Flower Pot Bay, is a small bay, some 250 m across, on the north coast of Pitt Island in the Chatham Islands group of New Zealand.  With a jetty at its western end, it is the main point of access by sea to the island.

The vicinity of the bay also holds the island's primary school, its church and its only tourist accommodation – the Flowerpot Bay Lodge.  The site has been identified as an Important Bird Area by BirdLife International because it supports a breeding colony of endangered Pitt shags, with 75 nests recorded in 1998.

References

Important Bird Areas of the Chatham Islands
Bays of the New Zealand outlying islands
Seabird colonies
Populated places in the Chatham Islands
Landforms of the Chatham Islands